The Petit Darray (also spelled Petit Darrey) (3,508 m) is a mountain of the Mont Blanc Massif, located north of La Fouly in the canton of Valais. It lies west of the Grand Darray, on the range south of the Saleina Glacier.

References

External links
 Petit Darray on Hikr

Mountains of the Alps
Alpine three-thousanders
Mountains of Valais
Mountains of Switzerland